Nuestro Show No Puede Parar is the second album by Mexican Pop singer Angélica Vale. It was released in 1990.

Track listing
 "Nuestro Show no Puede Parar" (Our Show Can't Stop) 3:47
 "Momento Para Amar" (Moment to Love)
 "Matine" 
 "Por Ti, Yo Soy" (For You, I Am)
 "Tic Tac" 2:53
 "Noticias De Ti" (News From You)
 "Lambada De Alegria" 
 "Amigo" (Friend)
 "Radio Romance"
 "Brinca Al Compas Del Amor" (Jumping Love's Compass) 3:05

1990 albums
Angélica Vale albums
CBS Records albums